Limnodriloides is a genus of clitellate oligochaete worms.

Species 
Species accepted within Limnodriloides include:

 Limnodriloides adversus Erséus, 1990
 Limnodriloides agnes Hrabĕ, 1967
 Limnodriloides anxius Erséus, 1990
 Limnodriloides appendiculatus Pierantoni, 1903
 Limnodriloides armatus Erséus, 1982
 Limnodriloides ascensionae Erséus, 1982
 Limnodriloides atriotumidus Erséus, 1982
 Limnodriloides australis Erséus, 1982
 Limnodriloides baculatus Erséus, 1982
 Limnodriloides barnardi Cook, 1974
 Limnodriloides basilicus Finogenova, 1986
 Limnodriloides biforis Erséus, 1990
 Limnodriloides bipapillatus Erséus, 1984
 Limnodriloides brycei Erséus, 1990
 Limnodriloides bulbopenitus Wang & Liang, 1997
 Limnodriloides clavellatus Finogenova, 1986
 Limnodriloides claviger Erséus, 1982
 Limnodriloides cribensis Erséus, 1990
 Limnodriloides ezoensis Takashima & Mawatari, 1996
 Limnodriloides faxatus Erséus & Milligan, 1988
 Limnodriloides flumineus Erséus, 1990
 Limnodriloides fraternus Erséus, 1990
 Limnodriloides fuscus Erséus, 1984
 Limnodriloides gossensis Erséus, 1997
 Limnodriloides hastatus Erséus, 1982
 Limnodriloides hawaiiensis Erséus & Davis, 1989
 Limnodriloides hrabetovae Erséus, 1987
 Limnodriloides insolitus Erséus, 1989
 Limnodriloides janstocki Erséus, 1992
 Limnodriloides lateroporus Erséus, 1997
 Limnodriloides macinnesi Erséus, 1990
 Limnodriloides major Erséus, 1990
 Limnodriloides maslinicensis  (Hrabĕ, 1971)
 Limnodriloides medioporus Cook, 1969
 Limnodriloides monothecus Cook, 1974
 Limnodriloides olearius Erséus & Milligan, 1989
 Limnodriloides parahastatus Erséus, 1984
 Limnodriloides pierantonii  (Hrabĕ, 1971)
 Limnodriloides problematicus Erséus, 1990
 Limnodriloides rubicundus Erséus, 1982
 Limnodriloides sacculus Erséus, 1990
 Limnodriloides scandinavicus Erséus, 1982
 Limnodriloides solitarius Erséus & Wang, 2005
 Limnodriloides sphaerothecus Erséus, 1982
 Limnodriloides stercoreus Erséus, 1990
 Limnodriloides tarutensis Erséus, 1986
 Limnodriloides tenuiductus Erséus, 1982
 Limnodriloides thrushi Erséus, 1989
 Limnodriloides toloensis Erséus, 1984
 Limnodriloides triplus Erséus, 1990
 Limnodriloides uniampullatus Erséus, 1982
 Limnodriloides validus Erséus, 1982
 Limnodriloides vermithecatus Erséus, 1997
 Limnodriloides vespertinus Erséus, 1982
 Limnodriloides victoriensis Brinkhurst & Baker, 1979
 Limnodriloides virginiae Erséus, 1982
 Limnodriloides winckelmanni Michaelsen, 1914

References

Further reading

Erséus, Christer. "Mangroves and marine oligochaete diversity." Wetlands Ecology and Management 10.3 (2002): 197–202.
Gustavsson, Lena M., and Christer Erséus. "Morphology and phylogenetic implications of oesophageal modifications in the Limnodriloidinae (Oligochaeta, Tubificidae)." Journal of Zoology 248.4 (1999): 467–482.

External links
WORMS

Tubificina
Taxa named by Christer Erséus